Amil Shivji (born 1990) is a Tanzanian filmmaker. His films generally tackle misrepresentations of Africa and its history, as well as the theme of neocolonialism.

Biography and career 
Born in Dar es Salaam, Shivi's roots can be traced back to Zanzibar. Often visiting as a child, he frequently draws inspiration from the island. Before launching his film career, Shivji worked as a journalist and radio host. He is the founder of Kijiweni Productions, a production company, and Kijiweni Cinema.

Shivji launched his career with two short fiction films, Shoeshine (2013) and Samaki Mchangani (2014). Both films participated in a number of international film festivals including the Rotterdam International Film Festival and the Panafrican Film and Television Festival of Ouagadougou (FESPACO) in Burkina Faso.

In 2015, he produced feature film Aisha, also screened internationally. The filmmaker's prize-winning feature directorial debut T-Junction (2017) opened the prestigious Zanzibar International Film Festival. In 2021, he released Vuta N’Kuvute (Tug of War), which premiered at the Toronto International Film Festival.

Filmography

Short films 

 2012: Who Killed Me
 2013: Shoeshine
 2014: Samaki Mchangani

Feature films 
 2015: Aisha (as producer)
 2017: T-Junction
 2021: Vuta N’Kuvute (Tug of War)

References

External links 
 

Tanzanian film directors
1990 births
Living people
People from Dar es Salaam